The VCU Rams women's lacrosse team will represent Virginia Commonwealth University in the National Collegiate Athletic Association (NCAA) Division I women's college lacrosse competition starting in the 2015–16 academic year. The Rams will play their home games at Cary Street Field located on the school's Monroe Park campus in Richmond, Virginia.

The Rams will play in the Atlantic 10 Conference.

References

External links
 

 
2015 establishments in Virginia
Lacrosse clubs established in 2015